Tell Mekhada is an archaeological site 400m southwest of Nebaa Faour in the Beqaa Mohafazat (Governorate). It dates at least to the Neolithic.

References

Baalbek District
Neolithic
Archaeological sites in Lebanon
Great Rift Valley